Yeast culture might refer to:

 A cultivated growth of the yeast organism
 Yeast Culture (company), a British film and digital media production company
 A yeast starter culture used in winemaking

See also
 National Collection of Yeast Cultures